Araceli Martinez-Olguin (born 1977) is an American lawyer from California who is a United States district judge of the United States District Court for the Northern District of California.

Education 

Martinez-Olguin received a  Bachelor of Arts from the Princeton School of Public and International Affairs in 1999 and a Juris Doctor from the UC Berkeley School of Law in 2004.

Career 

From 2004 to 2006, Martinez-Olguin served as a law clerk for Judge David Briones of the United States District Court for the Western District of Texas. From 2016 to 2017, she was an attorney for the United States Department of Education's Office for Civil Rights. From 2017 to 2018, she served as the managing attorney at the Immigrants' Rights Project at Community Legal Services in East Palo Alto, California. From 2018 to 2023, she was the supervising attorney at the National Immigration Law Center. She has also worked at the ACLU and at the Legal Aid Society-Employment Law Center. Martínez-Olguín is a member of the American Constitution Society Bay Area Lawyer Chapter Board of Directors. She also taught bilingual kindergarten through Teach for America in Oakland, California. She was also a lecturer at Berkeley Law, teaching Spanish for Lawyers in 2012 and 2013.

Federal judicial service 

On July 29, 2022, President Joe Biden announced his intent to nominate Martinez-Olguin to serve as a United States district judge of the United States District Court for the Northern District of California. On August 1, 2022, her nomination was sent to the Senate. President Biden nominated Martinez-Olguin to the seat vacated by Judge Jeffrey White, who assumed senior status on February 1, 2021. On September 21, 2022, a hearing on her nomination was held before the Senate Judiciary Committee. On December 1, 2022, her nomination was reported out of committee by a 12–10 vote. On January 3, 2023, her nomination was returned to the President under Rule XXXI, Paragraph 6 of the United States Senate; she was renominated later the same day. On February 2, 2023, her nomination was reported out of committee by an 11–9 vote. On February 28, 2023, the Senate invoked cloture on her nomination by a 48–47 vote. Later that day, her nomination was confirmed by a 49–48 vote, with the Vice President Kamala Harris voting in the affirmative. She received her judicial commission on March 3, 2023. She is the second Latina to serve on the U.S. District Court for the Northern District of California.

See also 
 List of Hispanic/Latino American jurists

References

External links 

1977 births
Living people
21st-century American judges
21st-century American lawyers
21st-century American women judges
21st-century American women lawyers
American Civil Liberties Union people
American judges of Mexican descent
American lawyers of Mexican descent
Hispanic and Latino American judges
Hispanic and Latino American lawyers
Hispanic and Latino American teachers
Immigration lawyers
Judges of the United States District Court for the Northern District of California
Mexican emigrants to the United States
People from Mexico City
Princeton School of Public and International Affairs alumni
Schoolteachers from California
Teach For America alumni
UC Berkeley School of Law alumni
United States district court judges appointed by Joe Biden